This is the list of rivers which are in and flow through Ontario. The watershed list includes tributaries as well.
Dee River, flows between Three Mile Lake and Lake Rosseau.

List of rivers arranged by watershed

Hudson Bay

Atlantic Ocean

Alphabetical list of rivers

See also 
List of rivers of Canada
List of rivers of the Americas
Hudson Bay drainage basin
List of lakes of Ontario
Geography of Ontario

References 

Ontario

Rivers